The men's 3000 metres event  at the 1981 European Athletics Indoor Championships was held on 22 February. The race was stopped one lap short, so the actual distance run was 2820 metres.

Results

References

3000 metres at the European Athletics Indoor Championships
3000